William Basil McIvor OBE, PC (NI) (17 June 1928 – 5 November 2004) was an Ulster Unionist politician, barrister and pioneer of integrated education.

Early life and education

The son of Rev. Frederick McIvor, a Methodist clergyman, McIvor was born in the Tullyhommon, County Fermanagh part of the village of Pettigo, which straddles the Northern Ireland border. McIvor attended the Methodist College, Belfast and the Queen's University of Belfast and was called to the Bar of Northern Ireland in 1950.  In his career at the Bar, Basil McIvor became Junior Crown Counsel and a Resident Magistrate in the 1970s.

Political career

He was elected to the Northern Ireland Parliament as Ulster Unionist Party MP for Larkfield in the 1969 election.  He was one of a group of MPs who supported the beleaguered Prime Minister, Terence O'Neill.  Viewed as a liberal he was given the job of Minister for Community Relations  by Brian Faulkner in 1971 and resigned from the Orange Order.

McIvor was a member of the Northern Ireland Assembly, 1973, topping the poll in Belfast South, and a member of the Ulster Unionist contingent who negotiated the Sunningdale Agreement in 1973.  When the powersharing Executive was set up in the aftermath of Sunningdale McIvor headed the Education Department. McIvor left politics after the fall of the Executive in 1974 and sat as a resident magistrate.

In 1987, he was subject of a motion tabled in the United Kingdom House of Commons by four UUP MPs who accused him of showing bias against unionists and members of the Orange Order in a county Antrim case and so demanded McIvor's removal from the bench.

Investigations

McIvor presided over the initial investigation into UVF supergrass William 'Budgie' Allen and that of several people accused of killing two corporals in Belfast.

Campaigning

He was involved in campaigning for shared schools for Protestant and Catholic pupils in Northern Ireland. In 1981 he became the first chairman of Lagan College, Northern Ireland's first integrated school. When Sinn Féin's Martin McGuinness became education minister he invited him to visit the college.  He was also a governor of Campbell College, Belfast from 1975 until his death.

Basil McIvor died on 5 November 2004 aged 76 while playing golf at Royal County Down.

Family

His son Jonathan McIvor was a senior Police Officer in both the Metropolitan Police Service and the Police Service of Northern Ireland (PSNI) as well as providing law enforcement advice to the European Union Police Mission for the Palestinian Territories

As a Chief Inspector in the Metropolitan Police Service, he was criticised by the Stephen Lawrence Inquiry for his failure to manage the initial investigation of the scene of the murder of Stephen Lawrence.

He was appointed OBE in the 1991 New Year Honours.

References

Books

 Basil McIvor, Hope Deferred: Experiences of an Irish Unionist, Blackstaff Press, Belfast, 1998.  (autobiography)

1928 births
2004 deaths
People from County Fermanagh
Ulster Unionist Party members of the House of Commons of Northern Ireland
Members of the House of Commons of Northern Ireland 1969–1973
Members of the Northern Ireland Assembly 1973–1974
People educated at Methodist College Belfast
Barristers from Northern Ireland
Members of the Bar of Northern Ireland
Members of the Privy Council of Northern Ireland
Officers of the Order of the British Empire
Members of the House of Commons of Northern Ireland for Larkfield
Executive ministers of the 1974 Northern Ireland Assembly